The Serbia women's national under-23 volleyball team represents Serbia in international women's volleyball competitions and friendly matches under the age 23 and it is ruled by the Serbian Volleyball Federation That is an affiliate of International Volleyball Federation FIVB and also a part of European Volleyball Confederation CEV.

Results

FIVB U23 World Championship
 Champions   Runners up   Third place   Fourth place

Team

Current squad
The following is the Serbia roster Under-23 team in the European Women's U23 World Qualification.

Head coach:  Marijana Boricic

References

External links
 Official website 

National women's under-23 volleyball teams
under